As of August 2022, Uganda Airlines operates flights to the following destinations:

See also
 Uganda Airlines (1976–2001)
 Air Uganda

References

External links
 Uganda Airlines Homepage

Lists of airline destinations